Joshua Filler (born 2 October 1997) is a German pool player from Bönen, Germany. In 2018 Filler defeated Carlo Biado 13–10 to win the 2018 WPA World Nine-ball Championship. The same year he was the youngest player to win the China Open and 2018 10-ball European Pool Championships. Filler became WPA and Euro Tour world number 1 in 2019, and later reached the final of the 2019 WPA World Ten-ball Championship before losing 10–7 to Ko Ping-chung.

Filler has also represented Europe in the Mosconi Cup, winning the MVP award at the 2017 and 2022 events .

Career
Filler started to play billiards at the age of seven, competing at a national level by 2007 (age 10). In 2017, Filler made his debut at the Mosconi Cup, representing Europe. He became the youngest player to do so in history, at 20 years of age. The following year, he won the China Open 9-ball tournament, and the ten-ball European Pool Championships.

Later, in 2018, Filler won his first world championship. Filler defeated the defending champion Carlo Biado in the final of the 2018 WPA World Nine-ball Championship to win the event. Filler had also won a bronze medal at the European Pool Championships earlier that season.

Personal life
Filler is married to fellow German pool player Pia Filler.

Titles and Achievements
 2022 Mosconi Cup (MVP) 
 2022 Mosconi Cup
 2022 Euro Tour Lasko Open 
 2022 World Pool Masters
 2022 U.K. Open 9-Ball Championship 
 2022 World Games Nine-ball Singles 
 2022 European Pool Championship 14.1 
 2022 Euro Tour Treviso Open 
 2022 Derby City Classic Bigfoot 10-Ball Challenge 
 2021 Mosconi Cup
 2021 American Straight Pool Championship 
 2021 World Cup of Pool - with (Christoph Reintjes)
 2021 European Pool Championship 9-Ball 
 2021 International Open Bigfoot 10-Ball Challenge 
 2021 Euro Tour Austria Open 
 2020 Mosconi Cup
 2019 AZBilliards Player of the Year 
 2019 World Team Trophy Nine-Ball 
 2019 U.S. Open 9-Ball Championship 
 2019 Euro Tour Leende Open 
 2019 World Pool Series Predator Grand Finale 
 2018 WPA World Nine-ball Championship 
 2018 World Pool Series 10-Ball Championship 
 2018 European Pool Championship 10-Ball 
 2017 Mosconi Cup (MVP) 
 2017 Mosconi Cup
 2017 China Open 9-Ball Championship 
 2016 German Pool Championship 9-Ball
 2015 German Pool Championship 10-Ball
 2015 German Pool Championship 8-Ball
 2015 German Pool Championship 14.1

References

External links
 Joshua Filler on AZBilliards.com

1997 births
Living people
German pool players
People from Unna (district)
Sportspeople from Arnsberg (region)
World champions in pool
WPA World Nine-ball Champions
20th-century German people
21st-century German people